Taishi may refer to:

Names
Taishi (surname), Chinese family name
Taishi (given name), Japanese given name

Ranks
Grand Preceptor, ancient Chinese top civilian position: taishi in Chinese
Taishi, an alternate name of the Japanese Daijō-daijin
Taishi (Mongol title), a rank of Mongolian nobility

Places
Taishi Town (太石镇), town in Lintao County, Gansu, China
Taishi Township (太石乡), township in Kang County, Gansu, China
Taishi, Guangzhou, village in Guangdong, China
Taishi, Hyōgo, town in Hyōgo, Japan
Taishi, Osaka, town in Osaka, Japan
Taisi, Yunlin, also known as Taishi, township in Yunlin County, Taiwan

Historical eras
Taishi (太始, 96BC–93BC), an era name used by Emperor Wu of Han
Taishi (泰始, 265–274), an era name used by Emperor Wu of Jin
Taishi (泰始, 465–471), an era name used by Emperor Ming of Liu Song
Taishi (太始, 551–552), an era name used by Hou Jing
Taishi (太始, 818), or Taesi, an era name used by Gan of Balhae